Parapseudoflavitalea is a Gram-negative, rod-shaped, microaerophilic non-motile genus of bacteria from the family of Chitinophagaceae with one known species (Parapseudoflavitalea muciniphila). Parapseudoflavitalea muciniphila has been isolated from a peritoneal tumour of a human.

References

Chitinophagia
Bacteria genera
Monotypic bacteria genera
Taxa described in 2020